I Let It In and It Took Everything is the second studio album by British heavy metal band Loathe. It was released on 7 February 2020 through SharpTone Records. The album received positive reviews; Metal Hammer named it as the 12th-best metal album of 2020.

Composition
Max Heilman of Riff Magazine called the album "a grand metalcore vision" and that it pushes "the boundaries of what heavy music can be while avoiding gimmicks altogether". Metal Hammer writer Remfry Dedman called it "impossible to pigeonhole". Kerrang! writer Jake Richardson, described the album as blending "their metallic crunch with ambient sounds, melodic guitars and elements of niche genres like shoegaze", and praising it for being able to "switch from vast sounding post-rock to chugging, dissonant metal with consummate ease". Sam Houlden of PunkNews described the album as "hardcore new romantic" due to its incorporation of "disparate, light and dark soundscapes". As well as moving between "pounding hardcore sections with tech-level syncopation, but also soaring, melodic chorus and post-chorus sections that take the song to a totally different place before the track culminates with an elongated electro-glitch-infused breakdown". In an article for Metal Hammer, the album was referred to as opening "the band's sound up to lush, shoegaze textures and shimmering guitars". Rock 'N' Load magazine praised the album for its incorporation of elements of nu metal and modern metalcore into its post-metal style. The album's eleventh track, "Heavy Is the Head That Falls with the Weight of a Thousand Thoughts", borders black metal. Multiple journalists have compared the album to Deftones. Loudwire described it as "a jaw-smacking awakening to the new breed of hardcore that gyrates with elastic, djenty grooves and trace of industrial-like propulsion. With their nothing-to-lose fits of rage, Loathe are primed for a breakout on their second record".

The album makes use of contrast between dual clean and unclean vocals, as well as downtuned guitars, low-pitched atmospherics and shoegaze guitar textures.

Track listing

Personnel

Loathe
 Kadeem France – vocals
 Erik Bickerstaffe – lead guitar, vocals
 Connor Sweeney – rhythm guitar
 Sean Radcliffe – drums
 Feisal El-Khazragi – bass

Production 
 Production – Loathe
 Mixing – George Lever
 Mastering – Jens Bogren
 Artwork – Loathe
 Additional photography – Olli Appleyard

References

2020 albums
Loathe (band) albums
SharpTone Records albums